Gagnefs IF is a Swedish football club located in Gagnef.

Background
Gagnefs IF currently plays in Division 4 Dalarna which is the sixth tier of Swedish football. They play their home matches at the Siljansvallen in Gagnef.

The club is affiliated to Dalarnas Fotbollförbund. Gagnefs IF have competed in the Svenska Cupen on 9 occasions and have played 14 matches in the competition.

Season to season

In their most successful period Gagnefs IF competed in the following divisions:

In recent seasons Gagnefs IF have competed in the following divisions:

Footnotes

External links
 Gagnefs IF – Official website
 Gagnefs IF on Facebook

Football clubs in Dalarna County
Association football clubs established in 1923
1923 establishments in Sweden